Eugène Baud (1866–1926) was a Swiss rower and rowing official. He was the first permanent president of the Fédération Internationale des Sociétés d'Aviron (FISA), the International Rowing Federation. He started for Lausanne RC and was later its president.

References

1866 births
1926 deaths
Swiss male rowers
Rowing officials
European Rowing Championships medalists